Emanuela Orlandi (born 14 January 1968) was a Vatican teenager who mysteriously disappeared while returning home from a flute lesson in Rome on 22 June 1983. Sightings of Orlandi in various places have been reported over the years, including inside Vatican City, but all have been unreliable. The girl's disappearance led to much speculation on the involvement of international terrorism, Italian organized crime, the Banco Ambrosiano, and a plot inside the Holy See to cover up a sex scandal.

The Orlandi family, in particular Pietro Orlandi (Emanuela's brother), consistently pressed the Vatican for release of information about the case, believing that the Holy See knew the truth. The Vatican always maintained strict silence about the matter, denying any accusation of involvement, but over the years, many voices from inside the Holy See suggested that someone actually knew what happened to the girl. In 2023, forty years after the disappearance of Orlandi, the Vatican City opened an official investigation for the first time at the behest of Pope Francis.

Personal life
Emanuela was the fourth of five children of Ercole and Maria Orlandi (née Pezzano). Her father was a lay employee in the papal household. The family lived inside Vatican City, and the children had the free run of the Vatican gardens, according to Pietro Orlandi, Emanuela's older brother.

Orlandi was in her second year of secondary school in Rome. Although the school year had concluded, she continued to take flute lessons three times per week at the Scuola di Musica Tommaso Ludovico da Victoria, connected with the Pontifical Institute of Sacred Music. She was also part of the choir of the church of Sant'Anna dei Palafrenieri in the Vatican.

Chronology
Orlandi usually travelled by bus to the music school, located in Piazza di Sant'Apollinare. She would get off after a few stops and walk the last few hundred metres. On Wednesday, 22 June 1983, Orlandi was late to class and the weather was extremely hot, so she asked her brother Pietro to drive her, but he had other commitments. "I've gone over it so many times, telling myself if only I had accompanied her maybe it wouldn't have happened", he recalled decades later. Later that day, Emanuela called home to explain why she was not back yet. Speaking to one of her sisters, she said she had received a job offer from a representative of Avon.

According to some reports, Orlandi allegedly met with the Avon representative shortly before her music lesson. At the end of the class, Orlandi spoke of the job offer with a female friend, who then left the girl at a bus stop in the company of another girl. Orlandi was allegedly last seen getting into a large, dark-coloured BMW.

At 3:00 pm on Thursday, 23 June, Orlandi's parents called the director of the music school to ask if any of their daughter's classmates had information. The police had suggested waiting, because "perhaps the girl was with friends". She was officially declared a missing person that day. Over the next two days, announcements of the disappearance were published with the telephone number of the Orlandi house in the newspapers Il Tempo, Paese Sera, and Il Messaggero.

At 6:00 pm on Saturday, 25 June, a phone call was received from a youth who claimed to be a sixteen-year-old boy named "Pierluigi". He reported that he and his fiancée had met the missing girl in Piazza Navona that afternoon. The young man mentioned Orlandi's flute, her hair, and the glasses that she did not like to wear, along with other details that fit the missing girl. According to "Pierluigi", Orlandi had just had a haircut and had introduced herself as "Barbarella". He claimed she stated that she had just run away from home and was selling Avon products.

On 28 June, a man calling himself "Mario" called the family and claimed to own a bar near Ponte Vittorio, between the Vatican and the music school. He said that a girl called "Barbara", a new customer, had confided to him about being a fugitive from home but said that she would return home for her sister's wedding. On 30 June, Rome was plastered with a large number of posters displaying Orlandi's photograph.

On 3 July, Pope John Paul II, during the Angelus, appealed to those responsible for Orlandi's disappearance, making the hypothesis of kidnapping official for the first time. Two days later, the Orlandi family received the first of a number of anonymous phone calls. Emanuela was supposedly the prisoner of a terrorist group demanding the release of Mehmet Ali Ağca, the Turkish man who shot the Pope in May 1981. No other information was given. In the following days, other calls were received, including one from a man identified as "the American", due to his apparent accent, who played a recording of Orlandi's voice over the phone. A few hours later, in another phone call to the Vatican, the same man suggested an exchange of Orlandi for Ağca. The anonymous interlocutor mentioned the "Mario" and "Pierluigi" of the earlier telephone calls, defining them as "members of the organisation".

On 6 July, a man with a young voice and an American accent informed the ANSA news agency of the demand for an Orlandi–Ağca exchange, asking for the Pope's participation within twenty days and indicating that a wastebasket in the public square near the Parliament would contain proof that Orlandi was indeed in his hands. These were to have been photocopies of her music school identity card, a receipt for tuition, and a note handwritten by the kidnapped girl.

On 8 July, a man with an alleged Middle Eastern accent phoned one of Orlandi's classmates, saying the girl was in his hands, and that they had twenty days to make the exchange with Ağca. The man also asked for a direct telephone line with Cardinal Agostino Casaroli, the Vatican secretary of state. The line was installed on 18 July. A total of sixteen telephone calls were made by "the American" from different public telephones.

On 17 July, on the instructions of the alleged kidnappers, an audio cassette was found near the headquarters of ANSA, which appeared to be a recording of a girl being tortured. The police told the family they did not believe it to be Orlandi, although her brother has expressed doubts about this. However, former DIGOS agent Antonio Asciore, who first found and listened to the audio cassette, claimed that the recording given to the Olrandi family and later published was not the original one he found. He claimed that in the original recording, there was not only a girl being tortured but also the voice of a man. Also, according to him, the original recording was longer than the published one. The presence of male voices was reported also in the original transcription of the recording made by the Italian authorities immediately after discovery, giving support to the claims made by Asciore, who implied that the original recording had been manipulated and that the recording given to the Orlandi family was fake. 

Eighteen years later, on the morning of 14 May 2001, the parish priest of the Gregory VII Church, near the Vatican, discovered a human skull of small dimensions and lacking a jaw in a bag with an image of Padre Pio in a confessional. Although it has not been identified as Orlandi's skull, the discovery generated suspicions that it might be.

Emanuela's father, Ercole, died in 2004, a month after giving his last interview.

In 2013, a few days after his election, Pope Francis met the Orlandi family after a mass and told them that "Emanuela is in heaven", implying the girl's death. According to the Orlandi family, this statement was proof that the Holy See knew what happened to Emanuela, despite the Vatican claiming over many years that it was not involved in the matter. Pietro Orlandi asked many times to have a meeting with the Pope in order to ask him more, but the Vatican never replied.

Theories
Over the years, a number of theories regarding motives for the crime have been broached in the Italian press. It happened some forty days after the unsolved disappearance of Mirella Gregori, and it has often been stated that the two events were connected.

Orlandi–Ağca connection theory, Stasi, and the KGB
Ağca, who once declared that Orlandi had been kidnapped by Bulgarian agents of the Grey Wolves, a Turkish ultra-nationalist, neo-fascist youth organization of which Ağca was a member, in a prison interview said that the girl was alive, not in danger, and living in a cloistered convent.

In mid-2000, Judge Ferdinando Imposimato, a prosecutor with extensive experience with high-profile investigations, based on what he had learned about the Grey Wolves, suggested that Orlandi, by then an adult, was living a perfectly integrated life in the Muslim community, and that she had probably lived for a long time in Paris.

In 2008, Günter Bohnsack, a former Stasi agent, rejected the theory that Orlandi had been kidnapped by the Grey Wolves. He said that the secret services of East Germany used the Orlandi case to create a false connection between Ağca and the youth organization in order to divert attention from the investigations into the theory that Ağca was actually involved with the secret services of Bulgaria when he studied his attempted assassination of Pope John Paul II. According to Bohnsack, it was the Stasi who sent fake letters to the Vatican written in Turkish or Italian in order to make them believe the Grey Wolves had the girl and wanted the release of Ağca. Bohnsack said the order for this operation (called "Operation Papst") came directly from the KGB.

Organised crime theory
Discovery of Enrico De Pedis grave

On 11 July 2005, an anonymous caller to the Italian television program Chi l'ha visto? said that to resolve the Orlandi case, it was necessary to look who was buried in the crypt of the Basilica di Sant'Apollinare, in Rome. It was discovered that the crypt contained the grave of Enrico De Pedis (1954–1990), leader of the roman gang Banda della Magliana. On 14 May 2012, the Italian police opened the tomb of De Pedis and took DNA samples.

The question was immediately asked why De Pedis, a violent criminal, had been buried in the crypt of a major Roman basilica, a mode of burial normally reserved for high-ranking figures such as cardinals. In fact, a newspaper article from 1997 had reported on this strange burial, provoking protests from the police union, but when neither the Vatican nor Opus Dei (owners of the basilica) felt the need to justify it, the matter was forgotten.

The anonymous caller of 2005 also suggested they investigate "the favor that De Pedis did for Cardinal Poletti", implying this was the reason for his burial at Sant'Apollinare. Poletti was at the time the president of the Episcopal Conference of Italy and Cardinal Vicar of the Diocese of Rome. In 2012, the Italian Ministry of Interior confirmed that Poletti had approved the burial.

While no clues were found in the tomb linking De Pedis to Orlandi, the information brought up for the first time the theory that Banda della Magliana could have been involved in the girl's kidnapping.

Testimony of Antonio Mancini and Sabrina Minardi

In February 2006, former Banda della Magliana member Antonio Mancini said in an interview with Chi l'ha visto? that he recogized the voice of "Mario" (one of the first two anonymous callers to the Orlandi family) as one of De Pedis's men, Ruffetto. This testimony was eventually confirmed by Sabrina Minardi, former girlfriend of De Pedis, who corroborated that Orlandi was kidnapped by De Pedis's men and that she herself had a role in the girl's concealment. She  said that the girl had been drugged and kept in her apartment in Torvaianica, near Rome, before being moved to a different one. Minardi also claimed that Orlandi was kidnapped by De Pedis' gang on the orders of Archbishop Paul Marcinkus (1922–2006), the disgraced former head of the Vatican's bank, IOR, "to send a message to someone above them" as part of a "power game". She also claimed to have driven Orlandi, in a drugged state, to the Vatican, where she was transferred to another car by a man dressed as a priest.

In 2009, Mancini confirmed Minardi's testimony.

Role of IOR and Banco Ambrosiano

In 2011, Mancini said that Orlandi's kidnapping was one of a number of attacks that the gang was making against the Vatican, in order to force the restitution of large amounts of money they had lent to the Vatican Bank through Roberto Calvi's Banco Ambrosiano. This was a Roman bank affiliated with the Vatican that laundered money coming from illicit transfers, including by Banda della Magliana. This theory was later called the "Polish money theory". The theory was that the Magliana Gang kidnapped Orlandi, a Vatican citizen and daughter of a Vatican employee, to put pressure on the Vatican to repay a large amount of money it had borrowed to secretly fund Solidarity, the Polish trade union that at the time was active in fighting communist rule in Poland, the then-Pope's homeland. Operating underground, Solidarity had significant financial support from both the US and the Vatican. According to this theory, IOR, led by  Marcinkus, was funding Solidarity using money from Banco Ambrosiano. After Ambrosiano's collapse in 1982 and the death of its head, Roberto Calvi, the Magliana Gang, wanting their money back, kidnapped Orlandi as a hostage.

Vatican sex scandal theory
In May 2012, 85-year-old exorcist Father Gabriele Amorth claimed that Orlandi was kidnapped by a member of the Vatican police for sex parties, and then murdered. Amorth claimed that officials of an unnamed foreign embassy were involved as well.

The Vatican sex scandal theory re-emerged in October 2022, with the release of the Netflix documentary Vatican Girl: The Disappearance of Emanuela Orlandi, which contained an exclusive testimony of one of Orlandi's best friends. The anonymous woman said that a week before Emanuela's disappearence, Orlandi confessed to her that she had been molested by "someone close to the Pope" on different occasions while she was in the Vatican Gardens.

On 14 December 2022, Italian journalist Alessandro Ambrosini published an exclusive recording from 2009 of Marcello Neroni, a man affiliated with De Pedis and Banda della Magliana, who implied that Orlandi was kidnapped by Enrico De Pedis and his Banda della Magliana on the request of someone inside the Vatican to cover up a sex scandal. The man was later interrogated by Italian authorities.

A presumed plot between the Banda della Magliana and the Vatican had already been mentioned back in 2009 by Maurizio Abbatino, one of the original Banda bosses who went on to collaborate with the judicial system.

Vatileaks and the London trail
In 2017, Italian journalist Emiliano Fittipaldi came into possession of secret Vatican documents that were stolen from the Vatican in 2014 in the major Vatican leaks scandal. One of these documents, signed 28 March 1997, sent to Archibishop Giovanni Battista Re and Archibishop Jean-Louis Tauran, was titled Resoconto sommario delle spese sostenute dallo stato Città del Vaticano per le attività relative alla cittadina Emanuela Orlandi ("Summary report of the expenses incurred by the Vatican City state for activities relating to the citizen Emanuela Orlandi"). This document allegedly shows the Vatican spent over 483 million lira (around 250,000 euros) for maintaining Orlandi from 1983 until 1997. These expenses included school fees at religious institutions, bills for St Mary's Hospital, London, and others. From this document, it transpired that Orlandi could have lived in London under the Vatican protection for years. The last bill is dated 1997 and says "Transfer to Vatican City with relative settlement of final practices", implying an eventual death of Orlandi and the transfer of the body back to the Vatican. The spokesman of the Holy See, Greg Burke, called these documents "false and ridiculous". These documents are considered false by both Vatican and Italian authorities. However, many—including the Orlandi family—have speculated that because these documents came from inside the Vatican, they could have been written and released on purpose as a warning between internal factions within the Vatican to keep the truth secret.

This was not the first time that someone had postulated the theory of Orlandi being hidden in London. On 17 June 2011, during an Italian TV program that included Pietro Orlandi, an anonymous caller, who identified himself as a former SISMI agent, claimed that Emanuela was still alive and being kept in a mental hospital in London, where she was constantly sedated. This man also claimed that the decision to kidnap Emanuela was made due to the fact that her father, Ercole, was aware of the money laundering involving the IOR and the Banco Ambrosiano, giving support to the money theory.

Other public speculation, activity
On 6 April 2007, in a Good Friday sermon in St. Peter's Basilica, Reverend Raniero Cantalamessa advised the congregation to make amends for sins before dying. He said, "Don't carry your secret to the grave with you!" This provoked speculation that he was suggesting someone at the Vatican held information about Orlandi's disappearance. Vatican spokesperson Rev. Federico Lombardi issued a statement that detailed Vatican cooperation with civil investigators over the years and said the Church had no objection to the opening of the De Pedis tomb, which was then being discussed. The statement read, "As far as we know, there is nothing hidden, nor are there 'secrets' in the Vatican to reveal on the subject. To continue to assert it is completely unjustified; also, we reiterate, yet again, all the material from the Vatican was handed over, in its time, to the investigating magistrates and to police authorities."

In October 2018, remains found during renovation work on the Holy See's embassy to Italy in Rome were the subject of speculation related to the Orlandi affair. An attorney for the Orlandi family objected to the media attention, saying, "We have no idea why the association with Emanuela was made.... We're still asking ourselves why you'd find some bones and immediately assume they were Emanuela's." Test results released on 1 February 2019 showed the remains belonged to a Roman man who died between 190 and 230 AD.

In the summer of 2018, the Orlandi family's lawyer received an anonymous letter with a picture of the statue of an angel in the Teutonic Cemetery, inside the Vatican. The letter read, "If you want to find Emanuela, search where the angel looks". On 10 July 2019, it was announced that the Vatican would be opening two tombs inside the Teutonic Cemetery, and they would then be examined by forensic anthropologist Giovanni Arcudi. The tombs were the "Tomb of the Angel", meant to contain the remains of Princess Sophie of Hohenlohe-Waldenburg-Bartenstein, and an adjacent one, which was meant to contain the remains of Duchess Charlotte Frederica of Mecklenburg-Schwerin. The exhumations took place on 11 July 2019. Neither Orlandi's body nor those of the two princesses were found. The Vatican said it would conduct an investigation into the whereabouts of the princesses' remains.

According to a report on 13 July 2019, the Vatican announced that two sets of bones had been found near the tombs of the two princesses, raising speculation that one might be the remains of Orlandi. The bones were discovered as staff probed other locations to which the princesses' remains may have been moved within the cemetery of the Pontifical Teutonic College. Further inspection of the site revealed two ossuaries placed beneath the floor of an area inside the college, closed by a trapdoor.

Reports by numerous news media outlets stated on 20 July 2019 that the tombs had actually been found to be empty. According to the BBC, for example, that first July 2019 search "only deepened the mystery as even the bones of two princesses thought to be there were missing". The same finding was reported by other news outlets, including The Guardian.

Thousands of human bones belonging to dozens of bodies were, however, found on 20 July, in the underground ossuaries at the Teutonic College. Forensic investigators were to analyse the remains and were expected to use carbon-14 methods to obtain a rough estimate of their age.

In October 2022, Netflix released a four-part docuseries entitled Vatican Girl: The Disappearance of Emanuela Orlandi. The documentary explored different theories surrounding Orlandi's disappearance, with a focus on theories involving the Vatican and organised crime.

2023 reopening of the case
On 9 January 2023, the Vatican announced that it would reopen the missing person case of Emanuela Orlandi. Pope Francis appointed head prosecutor Alessandro Diddi to lead the probe. The Vatican plans to conduct a complete review that will re-examine all files, reports, and testimony.

See also

 List of people who disappeared

References

Further reading
 

1968 births
1983 crimes in Italy
1983 in Vatican City
1980s in Rome
1980s missing person cases
June 1983 events in Europe
Crime in Vatican City
Crime in Rome
Missing Italian children
Missing person cases in Italy
Vatican City children
Catholic laity